Doch Chkae ( – "like a dog") are a Cambodian metal band from Phnom Penh, formed in 2015.

History 

Sochetra Pic, Sok Vichey, Ouch Theara and Ouch Hing were all born in a landfill in Khan Mean Chey, Phnom Penh, where they collected refuse to make a living. When the boys reached their adolescence their families could no longer provide for them, so Pic, Vichey, Theara and Hing were placed in the care of a local NGO Moms Against Poverty. The director of the NGO Timon Seibel introduced them to bands such as Slipknot and Rage Against the Machine and took them to a local concert of the Cambodian deathcore band Sliten6ix, which inspired the boys to start playing music; they formed a band a year later.

In 2018 Doch Chkae were invited to perform at Wacken Open Air festival in Germany, but their visa application was rejected. A petition calling the authorities to grant the band the visa was launched and signed by more than 10,000 people. Doch Chkae played at Wacken Open Air the following year.

On 9 January 2020 the band performed at the "Year End Party: Dear Agony" in Lela Saigon Bar, Ho Chi Minh City, Vietnam. On 13 March Doch Chkae released a 3-song EP "Worse than Dogs". In 2021 the band released the song "Tortured".

They were nominated 'Breakthrough Asian Band' at the 2021 Global Metal Apocalypse awards, they finished 10th.

Discograpy 
 Dream in Hell (2016, single)
 ខាំគ្នាដូចឆ្ (2016, single)
 Worse than Dogs (2020, EP)
 Tortured (2021, single)

References

External links
 YouTube channel
 Facebook page
 Bandcamp page
 A Slumdog Metal Fairytale - Cambodian Street Kids Doch Chkae Chasing Their Dream in Wacken. 17 January 2020. Subtropical Asia.
 A documentary about Doch Chkae-Slumdog Metal: Cambodian Street Kids Scream For Their Lives. 7 April 2018. Subtropical Asia.

Heavy metal musical groups
Cambodian rock music groups